Abraham Lederer (January 9, 1827, Libochovice, Bohemia  – September 17, 1916, Budapest) was a Czech-Hungarian educator and writer.


Life 
He was born in Libochovice, Bohemia. In 1840 he went to Prague, where he studied at the Teachers' Seminary and at the university.

In 1853 he taught at Břeclav, Moravia and in 1854 he accepted the post of director of the Jewish school at Tata, Hungary, whence he was called to the Israelitische Musterschule in 1857, becoming in the following year director of the Israelitic Teachers' Seminary at Budapest.

Lederer contributed much to pedagogics in general, and to the training of Jewish teachers in Hungary in particular. He was the founder and organizer of the Jewish normal school ("Landes-Präparandie"), of the Jewish National Teachers' Association, of the national pedagogical museum, of the Women's Industrial Association, and of the vacation colony for children. In 1869 the government commissioned him to translate Hungarian text-books into German, and appointed him director of the state seminaries and a member of the supreme board of education.

Literary works 
Of his works the following are noteworthy:
 "Heimathskunde" (Pest, 1859)
 "Erziehungslehre für Israelitische Eltern und Lehrer" (ib. 1865)
 "Leitfaden und Lesebuch für Lehrer" (ib. 1870)
 "Methodischer Leitfaden zum Deutschen Sprachunterricht" (Budapest, 1873)
 "Társadalmi Pädagogia" (ib. 1885), on social pedagogics
 "Hires Emberek Ismertető Jelei" ("Charakteristiken Berühmter Männer," 1896)
 "A Testi Büntetés Lélektana" (1901), on the psychology of corporal punishment
 "Iskolai Kirándulás a Csillagos Egbe" (1903), a guide to instruction in astronomy in schools

External links 
 http://mek.niif.hu/03600/03630/html/l/l13748.htm (Hungarian)
 http://www.austriaca.at/oebl_5/81.pdf (German)
 http://mek.niif.hu/00300/00355/html/ABC09006/09317.htm (Hungarian)

References 
 
 Bibliography: József Szinnyei, Magyar lrók Elete; lzraelita Tanügyi Ertesitö, 1897

1827 births
1916 deaths
People from Libochovice
Jewish Czech writers
19th-century Hungarian people
19th-century Czech people
Austro-Hungarian Jews
Jewish educators
Hungarian educators
Hungarian writers
Translators from Hungarian
Translators to German
Jewish Hungarian writers
Hungarian people of Czech descent
19th-century translators